Frank Potter Coburn (December 6, 1858 – November 2, 1932) was a U.S. Representative from Wisconsin.

Coburn was born on a farm in La Crosse County, Wisconsin near West Salem. He attended the public schools.
He engaged in agricultural pursuits near West Salem and also engaged in the banking business.
He was an unsuccessful Democratic candidate for election in 1888 to the Fifty-first Congress.

Coburn was elected as a member of the Democratic Party to the Fifty-second Congress (March 4, 1891 – March 3, 1893). He served Wisconsin's 7th congressional district
He was an unsuccessful candidate for reelection in 1892 to the Fifty-third Congress.
He resumed banking interests and agricultural pursuits near West Salem.
He served as member of the county board of supervisors from 1894 till 1903, serving as chairman in 1902 and 1903.
He was jury commissioner from 1897 to 1932.
Trustee of the county asylum 1907–1932.
He served as member of the board of review of income taxes for the county 1912–1926.
He died in La Crosse, Wisconsin, on November 2, 1932.
He was interred in Hamilton Cemetery, West Salem, Wisconsin.

Sources

1858 births
1932 deaths
People from West Salem, Wisconsin
Democratic Party members of the United States House of Representatives from Wisconsin
County supervisors in Wisconsin